Helmut Kofler is a former U.S. soccer player and current coach who earned five caps with the U.S. national team in 1968.

Kofler was a product of the Blau-Weiss Gottschee Soccer Club in Queens, New York.  Kofler spent much of his career in the German American Soccer League.  Kofler earned his five caps with the U.S. national team in 1968.  He earned his first cap on September 15, 1968 in a 3-3 tie with Israel.  A month later, he played in a qualifier for the 1970 FIFA World Cup, a 4-2 loss to Canada.  His last game with the national team was an October 23, 1968 loss to Haiti.  Today, Kofler coaches the GH Metros of New York’s Cosmopolitan Soccer League.

References

Living people
United States men's international soccer players
German-American Soccer League players
Blau-Weiss Gottschee players
American soccer coaches
American soccer players
Association footballers not categorized by position
Year of birth missing (living people)